William Lester "Gander" Terry (September 24, 1907 – February 22, 1991) was an American football player and coach. He served as the head football coach at Western Kentucky State Teachers College from 1938 to 1941 and at San Diego State University in 1946, compiling a career college football coaching record of 31–13–3.

Head coaching record

References

1907 births
1991 deaths
San Diego State Aztecs athletic directors
San Diego State Aztecs football coaches
Western Kentucky Hilltoppers basketball players
Western Kentucky Hilltoppers football coaches
Western Kentucky Hilltoppers football players
American men's basketball players